Gharwali Uparwali (Translation: My Wife and The Ghost of My First Wife) is an Indian fantasy-sitcom television series which originally aired on Star Plus from 3 July 2000 to 23 June 2003. Gharwali Uparwali received acclaim throughout its run. The show is created by Nirja Guleri. Gharwali Uparwali is written and directed by Shrey Guleri.

Gharwali Uparwali is considered as a milestone on Indian television's, it was first-ever indigenous fantasy-comedy franchise and the instant popularity of this trail-blazing new fantasy-sitcom genre, replete with top-of-the-line visual effects. and which appealed to children as well as adults at the same time, 

Gharwali Uparwali has been nominated for several major Television Awards including The Screen Awards for Best Serial (Comedy) in 2000, and The Indian Telly Awards for Comedy/Sitcom Of The Year in 2002.

A sequel series, Gharwali Uparwali Aur Sunny, also created by Nirja Guleri and directed by Shrey Guleri, aired on Star Plus from October 11, 2003, onwards as the second installment of this hugely successful Fantasy-Comedy franchise.

Cast

Main
 Mukul Dev as Ravi
 Ratna Pathak Shah as Madam JoJo
 Niki Aneja Walia as Pooja  [Gharwali]
 Manasi Joshi Roy as Chandini [Uparwali]
 Sudha Chandran as Pooja's Mother
 Sudhir Pandey as Ravi's Father
 Mickey Dhamejani as Sunny

Guest

 Rajat Kapoor as Advertising Agency Boss
 Anupam Kher as an eccentric Business Tycoon
 Sanjay Mishra as an idiosyncratic Film Director
 Sharat Saxena as Pooja's Uncle from Africa
 Akhilendra Mishra as Mafia Don
 Bob Christo as Karate Grandmaster
 Kamini Kaushal as Ravi's Governess
 Jayshree T. as Ravi's Aunt
 Kuldeep Pawar as Ravi's Boss
 Shehzad Khan as a fraud Godman 
 Lilliput as Master Burglar
 Brahmachari as a sinister Watchman (Haunted House)
 Avtar Gill as Pooja's Uncle
 Urvashi Dholakia as a Femme Fatale Spy 
 Ketki Dave as Boisterous Housewife  
 Sucheta Khanna as Pooja's Sister
 Sooraj Thapar as Ravi's Friend
 Papiya Sengupta as Ravi's Friend
 Achint Kaur as Pooja's Friend
 Kishori Godbole as Film Star Sridevi's Lookalike
 Amita Nangia  as Madam Jojo's Client
 Vinod Singh as Madam Jojo's Assistant
 Adi Irani as Dog Owner
 Neelu Kohli as Dog Owner's Wife
 Ashok Khanna as Karate Trainer

See also
 List of programs broadcast by Star Plus

References

External links
 

StarPlus original programming
Indian fantasy television series
2000 Indian television series debuts
2003 Indian television series endings
Indian comedy television series